Ferik, is a village in the Armavir Province of Armenia. It is named in honor of poet Ferik Polatbekov. Almost 82% (around 254 individuals) of the population are from the Yazidi minority.

See also  
Armavir Province
Yazidis in Armenia

References 

Report of the results of the 2001 Armenian Census

Populated places in Armavir Province
Yazidi villages
Yazidi populated places in Armenia